The 2014 Radio Disney Music Awards were held on April 26, 2014, at the Nokia Theatre L.A. Live in Los Angeles, California. The ceremony was edited and aired on April 27, 2014 on Radio Disney and Disney Channel. The big winner was Selena Gomez taking home 3 Ardys including song of the year.

Presenters and performers

Musical performers
Pre-show
Sabrina Carpenter – "Can't Blame a Girl for Trying"
McClain – "He Loves Me"
The Vamps – "Last Night"
Alex Angelo – "It's Your Night"

Main show
Ariana Grande – "Problem"
R5 – "(I Can't) Forget About You"
Fifth Harmony – "Miss Movin' On"
Zendaya – "Replay"
Becky G – "Can't Get Enough"
Austin Mahone – "Mmm Yeah"

Post_show

Aaliyah Rose - "Let it Go"

Presenters
 Spencer Boldman
 Dove Cameron
 Emblem3
 The cast of Girl Meets World
 Rowan Blanchard
 Sabrina Carpenter
 Ben Savage
 Danielle Fishel
 Nolan Gould
 Lucy Hale
 Olivia Holt
 Julianne Hough
 Laura Marano
 McClain
 Maia Mitchell
 Kelly Osbourne
 Emily Osment
 Jason Ritter
 Jessica Sanchez
 Cody Simpson
 Booboo Stewart
 The Vamps
 Tyrel Jackson Williams

Nominees
On February 22, 2014, the nominations were announced.

Best Female Artist
Demi Lovato
Katy Perry
Taylor Swift

Best Male Artist
Justin Timberlake
Cody Simpson
Austin Mahone

Best Music Group
One Direction
Emblem3
R5

Breakout Artist
Fifth Harmony
Ariana Grande
Zendaya

Best New Artist
Becky G
Celeste Buckingham
The Vamps*

Song of the Year
"Come & Get It" - Selena Gomez
"Roar" - Katy Perry
"Best Song Ever" - One Direction

Best Crush Song
"Still Into You" - Paramore
"Chloe (You're the One I Want)" - Emblem3
"What About Love" - Austin Mahone

Fiercest Fans
Swifties - Taylor Swift
Directioners - One Direction
Katycats - Katy Perry

Best Musical Collaboration
"Everything Has Changed" - Taylor Swift feat. Ed Sheeran
"Popular Song" - Mika feat. Ariana Grande
"Clarity" - Zedd feat. Foxes

Best Song to Rock Out to With Your BFF
"Me & My Girls" - Fifth Harmony
"Here's to Never Growing Up" - Avril Lavigne
"Loud" - R5

Best Song That Makes You Smile
"Ooh La La" - Britney Spears
"La Da Dee" - Cody Simpson
"The Fox (What Does the Fox Say?)" - Ylvis

Radio Disney's Most Talked About ArtistSelena GomezAriana Grande
Austin Mahone

Catchiest New Song"The Fox (What Does the Fox Say?)" - Ylvis"Classic" - MKTO
"I Wish" - Cher Lloyd

Favorite Song from a Movie or TV Show"Let It Go" - Idina Menzel (Frozen)"Crusin' For a Brusin'" - Ross Lynch (Teen Beach Movie)
"Ooh La La" - Britney Spears (The Smurfs 2)

Best Song to Dance To"Birthday" - Selena Gomez"Dance with Me Tonight" - Olly Murs
"Wings" - Little Mix

Favorite Roadtrip Song"Made in the USA" - Demi Lovato"Best Day of My Life" - American Authors
"Pass Me By" - R5

Artist with the Best StyleZendayaAustin Mahone
Becky G

Special award
Hero Award
Shakira received the Hero Award, an honor for contribution to charitable work.

Heroes for Change Award
Arianna Lopez, Matthew Kaplan and Yossymar Rojas were honored for contribution for their charitable work.

Other special awards
Ariana Grande was honored with the Chart Topper Award for her great performance on the charts.
R5 was honored with the Show Stopper Award' for their sold out shows on Louder Tour''.

References

Radio Disney Music Awards
Radio Disney
Radio Disney
Radio Disney Music Awards
2014 awards in the United States